L'Escole des Filles, ou la Philosophie des dames, known in English as The School of Venus, is an early work of erotica in French. Published anonymously in 1655, later editions sometimes ascribe it to M[ichel] Millilot and Jean L'Ange.

Characters 
 Robinet (Mr. Roger)
 Franchon (Katherine = Katy)
 Susanne (Frances = Frank)

Synopsis 

The work takes the form of two dialogues in which two cousins ​​discuss sexual topics. In a summary, which precedes the two dialogues, the circumstances of the plot are briefly described. Robinet, the son of a trader, is in love with a young girl named Fanchon, but because of her naivety he is unable to approach her. He therefore convinces Fanchon's older cousin Susanne to enlighten her through a trusting conversation and at the same time to kindle her lust.

In the course of their conversation, Susanne and Fanchon discuss a variety of topics, such as the age of marriage, the male and female sex organs, and sexual intercourse. At the end of the first dialogue, Fanchon agrees to let Robinet deflower her.

The second dialogue takes place a few days later. When asked by Susanne, Fanchon gives a detailed account of her first intercourse with Robinet. The two women address other topics including sex positions, flagellation, penis sizes, birth control and marriage.

Reception 
In his diary Samuel Pepys records reading and (in an often censored passage) masturbating over this work. The work was translated anonymously into English as The School of Venus, or the Ladies Delight (1680). The London bookseller Edmund Curll was prosecuted in 1728 for producing an English translation. More recently, Donald Thomas has translated L'Escole des Filles into modern English; he describes the original as "both an uninhibited manual of sexual technique and an erotic masterpiece of the first order".

See also 

 Whore dialogues

References

Notes

Citations

Sources 
 Greenberg, Mitchell (2001). Baroque Bodies: Psychoanalysis and the Culture of French Absolutism. Ithaca, NY: Cornell University Press. . pp. 78–79.
 Muchembled, Robert (2008). Orgasm and the West: A History of Pleasure from the 16th century to the Present. . Polity. p. 90.
 Hyde, Harford Montgomery (1964). A History of Pornography. London: Heinemann. pp. 19, 155.
 Suarez, Michael F.; Woudhuysen, H. R., eds. (2010). "Pornography". In The Oxford Companion to the Book. Oxford University Press. .
 Thomas, Donald, ed. (1971). The School of Venus. New American Library (Panther, 1972). .

Further reading 

 Charpentier, François M. (1724). Carpentariana ou Remarques d’histoire, de morale, de critique, d'érudition et de bons mots de M. Charpentier. Paris: Nicolas Le Breton, Fils. pp. 79–82.
 Dens, Jean-Pierre (1991). «L'Escole des Filles: premier roman libertin du XVIIe siècle?». Société d’études pluridisciplinaires du dix-septième siècle français, Cahier 5(1): pp. 239–248.
 Lachèvre, Frédéric (1968). Le libertinage au e siècle. Vol. 7. Paris: E. Champion. pp. 82, 84, 124.
 McKenna, Antony; Mothu, Alain (1997). La philosophie clandestine à l'Âge classique. Universitas. . p. 407.
 Pepys, Samuel (1976). The Diary of Samuel Pepys. Latham, Robert; Matthews, William (eds.). Vol. 9. Berkley: University of California Press. pp. 57–59 [entry for 8 and 9 February 1668].
 Eros in Town. Great Britain: Headline, 1989. .
 L'Escole des Filles, ou la Philosophie des dames. Paris, 1667.
 L'Escole des Filles de Mililot. Brussels, [n.d.].
 The School of Venus, or the Ladies Delight. 1680.
 "The School of Venus". WordPress. Retrieved 28 October 2022.

1655 books
Erotic fiction